Thorneywood railway station was a station on the former Great Northern Railway Nottingham Suburban railway in Thorneywood, Nottingham, England. It opened in 1889, regular passenger services ceased in 1916. Woodthorpe Grange Park opened to the public in 1922. On 10 July 1928 King George V and Queen Mary visited the park and 17,000 school children travelled to the event on the NSR to Sherwood and Thorneywood Stations (which had been re-opened for the event). An enthusiasts special ran on 16 June 1951 but goods train finished on 1 August 1951 when the line was abandoned. 
and the track was lifted in 1954.

See also
Sherwood railway station
St Ann's Well railway station
Nottingham's Tunnels

References

Further reading

Marshall, J., (June 1961) "Nottingham Suburban Railway" Railway Magazine article

Disused railway stations in Nottinghamshire
Former Great Northern Railway stations
Railway stations in Great Britain opened in 1889
Railway stations in Great Britain closed in 1916